The 25th Lo Nuestro Awards ceremony, presented by the American network Univision, honored the best Latin music of 2012 in the United States and took place on February 21, 2013, at the American Airlines Arena in Miami, Florida beginning at 5:00 p.m. PST / 8:00 p.m. EST. During the ceremony, Lo Nuestro Awards were presented in 33 categories. The ceremony, televised in the United States by Univision, was produced by Antonio Guzmán. Mexican performers Ninel Conde and Pedro Fernández hosted the show.

Mexican-American singer Jenni Rivera earned five awards including Artist of the Year; a posthumous tribute for her was held in the ceremony and featured performances by singers Olga Tañón, Lupillo Rivera, Shaila Dúrcal, Diana Reyes and María José. American artist Prince Royce received six accolades. Multiple winners also included Mexican bands 3BallMTY, Jesse & Joy, Maná, Gerardo Ortíz, and Puerto Rican-American duo Wisin & Yandel. To further celebrate the twenty-fifth anniversary of the Lo Nuestro Awards, Dominican singer-songwriter Juan Luis Guerra presented a medley of songs performed by him on previous ceremonies, and Colombian singer Carlos Vives premiered his single "Volví a Nacer", ten years after his last appearance at the show. The telecast garnered more than 6.4 million viewers in North America.

Winners and nominees 

The nominees for the 25th Lo Nuestro Awards were announced on December 2, 2012, during the morning show ¡Despierta América!. American singers Romeo Santos and Prince Royce received the highest number of nominations, with seven each; Santos and Royce were nominated against each other in three categories in the Tropical field, including Album, Song and Artist of the Year. The winners were announced before the live audience during the ceremony, with Mexican-American singer Jenni Rivera being one of the most awarded performers, earning five accolades, including Pop Album (Joyas Prestadas (Pop)), Pop Song ("A Cambio de Qué"), Pop and Regional Mexican Female Artist, and Artist of the Year. Rivera's two oldest daughters, Chiquis and Jacqie, collected her awards, after the singer's death on December 9, 2012.

Royce became the night's biggest winner, receiving six accolades, four in the Tropical Field (Album, Song, Male Artist and Traditional Performance), and a further two for his duet with Mexican band Maná (Collaboration of the Year and Rock/Alternative Song). Maná dominated the Rock Field, also receiving Rock/Alternative Album and Rock/Alternative Artist for a total of four. Mexican band Jesse & Joy was nominated five times and won for Pop Duo or Group and Video of the Year for "¡Corre!", which also was named Record and Song of the Year at the 13th Latin Grammy Awards.

Puerto Rican-American singer Olga Tañón was awarded for Tropical Female Artist, her twenty-third Lo Nuestro accolade, the most for any performer in the award show's history. Líderes by reggaeton duo Wisin & Yandel was the Urban Album of the Year. Upon release the album reached number-one on the Billboard Top Latin Albums chart. Mexican band 3Ball MTY won for New Artist, after winning the same award at the Latin Grammys; their record Inténtalo was the third-best selling Latin album of 2012 in the United States and received the Lo Nuestro for Regional Mexican Album. The Lifetime Achievement award was earned by Mexican performer Pedro Fernández, also the host of the evening. Spanish singer-songwriter Alejandro Sanz was the recipient of the Excellence Award and was selected as the Pop Male Artist of the Year.

Winners are listed first and indicated with a double-dagger.

Ceremony information

Categories and voting process
The categories considered were for the Pop, Tropical, Regional Mexican, and Urban genres, with additional awards for the General Field that includes nominees from all the genres for the Artist of the Year, Collaboration, Video and New Artist categories. The nominees were selected through an online voting poll that received 500,000 votes; the winners were chosen from a total of 130 nominations in 33 different categories.

Note: The remaining awards were announced at the Lo Nuestro Awards website.

Musical performers
The telecast included eighteen musical performances. In order to celebrate the twenty-fifth anniversary of the Lo Nuestro Awards, Dominican singer-songwriter Juan Luis Guerra presented a medley of songs performed by him on previous ceremonies. Colombian artist Carlos Vives debuted his single "Volví a Nacer", ten years after his last appearance in the show. Vives also closed the ceremony. Mexican bands Jesse & Joy, La Arrolladora Banda El Limón de René Camacho and 3Ball MTY (with América Sierra) also performed.

Spanish singer David Bisbal presented a tribute to fellow Spanish singer-songwriter Alejandro Sanz, who performed "Mi Marciana" and "Corazón Partío". Mexican singer Thalía presented a duet with American artist Prince Royce, while Puerto-Rican American artists Ricky Martin and Draco Rosa reunited for the first time to perform the song "Más y Más". Presentations by Chino & Nacho, Elvis Crespo (with Fito Blanko), Pedro Fernández, Gerardo Ortíz, Pitbull, Romeo Santos, and Olga Tañón, were also part of the program.

Mexican-American performer Lupillo Rivera held a tribute to late singer Jenni Rivera and was joined onstage by several singers, including Shaila Dúrcal, María José, Diana Reyes and Olga Tañón. At the time of the tribute the audience was able to participate through their Facebook and Twitter accounts creating a "virtual applause".

Source:

Ratings and reception
The American telecast on Univision drew in an average 6.4 million people during its three hours of length. Univision was the second in the ratings in the 18-34 demographic, over ABC, CBS and NBC. An estimated 11.6 million total viewers watched all or part of the awards. The 2013 ceremony had the highest audience since 2009 and garnered more Latin viewers than the Academy Awards, American Music Awards, Billboard Music Awards, and Primetime Emmy Awards of 2012, combined. Regarding the social media interaction, Univision and the Lo Nuestro Awards were the number-one social network and program; the show was the most socially active program in the network's history, with a social increase of 320% from 2012. According to Sara Bidel of TV by the Numbers, the broadcast was the second most engaging entertainment show of any language or network, over the Golden Globe Awards and People's Choice Awards. Agustín Barreto and Carlos Marmo were awarded in the television field of the "22nd Annual Latin Music Awards" hosted by the American Society of Composers, Authors and Publishers for the "Main Theme and Incidental Music" of the 2013 Lo Nuestro Awards.

See also
2012 in Latin music
Latin Grammy Awards of 2012
Latin Grammy Awards of 2013

References

2013 in Florida
2013 in Latin music
2013 music awards
Lo Nuestro Awards by year
2010s in Miami